Medius calceus is a moth of the family Erebidae first described by Michael Fibiger in 2011. It is found in Nepal (it was described from the Kathmandu Valley).

The wingspan is 11.5–14 mm. The forewings are broad and long with a brown ground colour, with blackish brown at the basal part of the costa and in all medial and terminal areas. The hindwing ground colour is grey brown with a discal spot.

References

Micronoctuini
Taxa named by Michael Fibiger
Moths described in 2011